Kubrat Municipality is a municipality (obshtina) in Razgrad Province, Northeastern Bulgaria, located in the Danubian Plain about 10 km south of Danube river. It is named after its administrative centre - the town of Kubrat.

Settlements 

Kubrat Municipality includes the following 17 places (towns are shown in bold):

Demography 
The following table shows the change of the population during the last four decades. Since 1992 Kubrat Municipality has comprised the former municipality of Yuper and the numbers in the table reflect this unification.

See also
Provinces of Bulgaria
Municipalities of Bulgaria
List of cities and towns in Bulgaria

References

External links
 Official website 

Municipalities in Razgrad Province